Liu Li (born 12 March 1971) is a retired Chinese middle-distance runner who specialized in the 800 and 1500 metres.

International competitions

References

1971 births
Living people
Chinese female middle-distance runners
Athletes (track and field) at the 1992 Summer Olympics
Olympic athletes of China
Asian Games medalists in athletics (track and field)
World Athletics Championships athletes for China
Athletes (track and field) at the 1994 Asian Games
Asian Games silver medalists for China
Medalists at the 1994 Asian Games